Kimmswick Historic District is a historic national historic district located at Kimmswick, Jefferson County, Missouri. The district encompasses 44 contributing buildings, 1 contributing site, and 1 contributing structure in the central business district and surrounding residential sections of Kimmswick.  It developed between about 1859 and 1940 and includes representative examples of Bungalow / American Craftsman style architecture. Notable buildings include the Barbagallo House (c. 1850), Bernard Klein House (c. 1865), Horninghauser House (c. 1865), Franz A Hermann / John O'Heim House and Brewery (c. 1859), Kimmswick Post Office (1914), Martin Meyer Building (c. 1880), The Old Market (c. 1877), Rauschenbach Building (1884), Phillip Meyer Building (c. 1875), Ambrose Ziegler House (c. 1925), and Kimmswick City Hall (c. 1903).

It was listed on the National Register of Historic Places in 2007.

References 

Historic districts on the National Register of Historic Places in Missouri
Bungalow architecture in Missouri
Buildings and structures in Jefferson County, Missouri
National Register of Historic Places in Jefferson County, Missouri